is a Japanese football player. He plays for Tokyo Verdy.

Career
Shogo Hayashi joined J2 League club Tokyo Verdy in 2016. He left the club at the end of 2018.

Club statistics
Updated to 22 February 2019.

References

External links
Profile at Tokyo Verdy

1997 births
Living people
Association football people from Tokyo
Japanese footballers
J2 League players
Tokyo Verdy players
Association football defenders